Clotworthy Skeffington, 3rd Viscount Massereene (1661 – 1714) was an Anglo-Irish soldier, politician and peer. 

Skeffington was the son of John Skeffington, 2nd Viscount Massereene and Mary Clotworthy, the daughter of John Clotworthy, 1st Viscount Massereene.

During the Williamite War in Ireland, he joined the Earl of Mount Alexander's Protestant militia in 1688 and received a commission as a colonel from William III of England in January 1689. Skeffington participated in the successful defence of Derry during the Siege of Derry from April to August 1689. Like his father, he was attainted by James II of England's Patriot Parliament in Dublin in 1689.

After the war, Skeffington was the Member of Parliament for Antrim County in the Irish House of Commons from 1692 to 1693. He inherited his father's peerage in 1695 and assumed his seat in the Irish House of Lords. He was appointed Governor of Londonderry in 1699. 

On 9 March 1680, he married Rachel Hungerford, by whom he had one son and three daughters. He was succeeded in his title by his son, Clotworthy Skeffington.

References

1661 births
1714 deaths
17th-century Anglo-Irish people
18th-century Anglo-Irish people
Irish MPs 1692–1693
Irish Presbyterians
Irish soldiers
Members of the Irish House of Lords
Members of the Parliament of Ireland (pre-1801) for County Antrim constituencies
Viscounts in the Peerage of Ireland
Williamite military personnel of the Williamite War in Ireland